Gradin is a settlement in the City Municipality of Koper in the Littoral region of Slovenia.

The former parish church in the settlement is dedicated to the Feast of the Holy Cross.

History
In 1954, when the Free Territory of Trieste was dissolved and Zone B was assigned to Yugoslavia, Gradin (together with Abitanti, Belvedur, Brezovica pri Gradinu, Koromači–Boškini, Močunigi, Pregara, and Sirči) was originally assigned to the Socialist Republic of Croatia. In 1956 these villages were reassigned to the Socialist Republic of Slovenia.

References

External links
Gradin on Geopedia

Populated places in the City Municipality of Koper